The Panama national cricket team represents Panama in international cricket competitions. The Panama Cricket Association became an affiliate member of the International Cricket Council (ICC) in 2002 and is an associate member since 2017. Their international debut is believed to have taken place against a side from Trinidad and Tobago in 1964.

In April 2018, the ICC decided to grant full Twenty20 International (T20I) status to all its members. Therefore, all Twenty20 matches played between Panama and other ICC members after 1 January 2019 will be a full T20I.

History

Cricket was introduced to Panama by colonials from the West Indies during the creation of the Panama Canal. After the colonials left the country, most of the nation's  attention was turned to Cricket. The growing number of inhabitants of Indian origin created a group called the Indian Society.
The purpose of this society was to create opportunities for relationships and to find new venues in which cricket could be played. Due to this effort, the popularity of the game grew. 
Panama joined the ICC as an Affiliate Member in 2002 and since then, cricket has been flourishing among the younger population of the country.

2018-Present
In April 2018, the ICC decided to grant full Twenty20 International (T20I) status to all its members. Therefore, all Twenty20 matches played between Panama and other ICC members after 1 January 2019 will be a full T20I.

In September 2018,Panama  took part in 2018–19 ICC T20 World Cup Americas Qualifier, finished on 3rd place in Northern Sub Region.

Panama played their first ever Twenty20 International match against Costa Rica in 2019 Central American Cricket Championship.

International competition

The team's first international matches in recent years came in a friendly series played against Venezuela in 2000, which Panama won 1–0. Panama was invited to play in the fourth South American Cricket Championships later that year. The team performed well in its first international tournament, finishing fourth of the seven teams.

Panama has been playing without the services of a national coach. Playing in recent regional ICC tournaments, Panama has finished second and third, ahead of countries such as Belize, Brazil, and Turks and Caicos. The most recent participation came in the 2010 Americas Division Two, held in the Bahamas, where the team won three matches out of four and only missed out on promotion on net run-rate.

Development programme

The chief concern is the loss of cricket grounds. During recent years, four grounds have been lost to soccer due to financial difficulties. The Panama Cricket Association is therefore looking to a secure a ground for its national players.

Plans are being made to start coaching for junior players but once again this is limited by finances as use of a gym is required, due to a rainy season that lasts for eight months of the year.

Progress in Tournaments since 2002

In 2002, Panama was granted affiliate status by the ICC along with a number of other countries in the Americas Region. Two years later, they hosted their first international tournament, the Americas Affiliate Championships. They finished as runners up to the Bahamas, just missing out on qualification for the ICC Americas Championship.

The affiliates tournament was expanded to a multi-division competition in 2006, and Panama was placed in Division Two. They finished third in that tournament, which was played in Argentina, behind the hosts and the Bahamas. They retained their place in Division Two for 2008. In this part of the competition, played in Suriname, Panama finished in third place and remained in the division for the next cycle, in 2010. In the same year, Panama also finished in 3rd place behind Suriname and the hosts, the Bahamas. In the 2011 Championship, Panama stayed as runners-up behind Suriname in Division 2.

Panama entered and hosted the Central American Championships for the first time in 2009. They came in as favorites, being the strongest Central American international side, and won the competition. The tournament was their first international Twenty20 competition.

Panama also took part in the America Regional T20 3rd Division Championship in Buenos Aires, Argentina in March 2014.

Tournament history

ICC Americas Championship
2000: Did not participate
2002: Did not participate
2004: Did not participate
2006: 3rd place (Division Two)
2008: 3rd place (Division Two)
2010: 3rd place (Division Two)
2011: 2nd place (Division Two)
2013: 2nd place (Division Two)

Americas Affiliate Championships
2001: 4th place
2004: 2nd place

South American Cricket Championships
 Dec 2000: 4th place

Central American Championships
2006: Did not participate
2007: Did not participate
2009: Winners
2015: Winners
2019: 3rd place

ICC T20 World Cup Americas Qualifier
2018-19-:3rd place

Players
Panama's squad for 2023 ICC Men's T20 World Cup Americas Qualifier from 25 February to 04 march 2023.

 Anilkumar Natubhai Ahir (wk)
 Khengar Bhai Ahir
 Nikunj Ahir
 Rahul Ahir
 Vishal Ahir
 Irfan Hafejee (c)
 Abdullah Jasat
 Mahmud Jasat
 Ahmadi Rawat
 Ahmed Patel
 Faizan Patel
 Huzaifa Patel (wk)
 Sohel Patel
 Mohmad Sohel Patel

Records

International Match Summary — Panama

Last updated 2 March 2023

Twenty20 International 

 Panama's highest score: 148/6 v Mexico, 27 April 2019 at Reforma Athletic Club, Naucalpan
 Highest individual score: 72, Yusuf Ebrahim v Mexico, 27 April 2019 at Reforma Athletic Club, Naucalpan
 Best bowling figures in an innings: 4/26, Anilkumar Natubhai Ahir v Argentina on 10 November 2021 at Sir Vivian Richards Stadium, Antigua.

Most T20I runs for Panama

Most T20I wickets for Panama

T20I record versus other nations

Records complete to T20I #2010. Last updated 2 March 2023.

See also
 List of Panama Twenty20 International cricketers
 George Headley

References

External links
Panama Cricket.net

Cricket in Panama
National cricket teams
Cricket
Panama in international cricket